Bala Serest (also Romanized as Bālā Serest; also known as Bālā Sar Rost) is a village in Gatab-e Shomali Rural District, Gatab District, Babol County, Mazandaran Province, Iran. At the 2006 census, its population was 993, in 228 families.

References 

Populated places in Babol County